Donald Steinbeisser (April 15, 1935 – September 12, 2020) was Republican member of the Montana Legislature. He served Senate District 19, representing Sidney, Montana from 2005 to 2012. He previously served two terms in the Montana House of Representatives. Due to Montana's term limits, Steinbeisser was ineligible to run in the 2012 election.

Steinbeisser was a farmer, rancher and business owner. He served in the US Army Reserve from 1957 to 1962.

References

Living people
1935 births
Republican Party Montana state senators
Republican Party members of the Montana House of Representatives
People from Sidney, Montana